The First Baptist Church is a historic church at 727 Scotland Road in Williamsburg, Virginia.  It is a brick Colonial Revival structure, built in 1956 to a design by Norfolk architect Bernard Spigel.  It is of only two known church designs by Spigel.

History 
The congregation was founded in the 1770s as a non-denominational group of free and enslaved African-Americans, and became officially Baptist in 1781. Located for many years in a church on Nassau Street, it was relocated by the Colonial Williamsburg Foundation to its present location at the foundation's expense.

The building was listed on the National Register of Historic Places in 2017.

John M. Dawson was pastor for over forty-five years and was also a Virginia state senator between 1874 and 1877 during the Reconstruction Era.

See also
National Register of Historic Places in Williamsburg, Virginia

References

Churches on the National Register of Historic Places in Virginia
National Register of Historic Places in Williamsburg, Virginia